The following outline is provided as an overview of and topical guide to District of Columbia:

Washington, D.C., legally named the District of Columbia, in the United States of America, was founded on July 16, 1790, after the inauguration of City of Washington, the new capital of the country.

The City of Washington was originally a separate municipality within the Territory of Columbia until the District of Columbia Organic Act of 1871 effectively merged the City and the Territory into a single entity. It is for this reason that everything within its boundaries is legally the District of Columbia.

General reference

 Names
 Common name: Washington, D.C.
 Official name: District of Columbia
 Abbreviations and name codes
 Postal symbol:  DC
 ISO 3166-2 code:  US-DC
 Internet second-level domain:  .dc.us
 Adjectivals:
 District of Columbia
 District
 DC
 Demonym: Washingtonian

Geography of Washington, D.C.

 The District of Columbia is: The federal capital district of the United States of America
 Location
 Northern hemisphere
 Western hemisphere
 Americas
 North America
 Anglo America
 Northern America
 United States of America
 Contiguous United States
 Eastern United States
 East Coast of the United States – even though the District of Columbia does not include any coastline, it is generally considered to be part of the Eastern Seaboard region.
 Northeast megalopolis
 Mid-Atlantic states
 Population of Washington, D.C.: 601,723  (2010 U.S. Census)
 Area of Washington, D.C.: 63.8 mi sq

Geographic features of Washington, D.C.
Atlantic coastal plain
Atlantic Seaboard fall line
Boundary Channel
Buzzard Point
Capitol Hill
Columbia Island
Georgetown Reservoir
Hains Point
Dalecarlia Reservoir
McMillan Reservoir
Meridian Hill
Piedmont (United States)
Southwest Waterfront
Theodore Roosevelt Island
Rivers of Washington, D.C.
Three Sisters
Tidal Basin
Washington Channel

Places in Washington, D.C.
 Historic places in Washington, D.C.
Boundary Markers of the Original District of Columbia
Chesapeake and Ohio Canal
Jefferson Pier
 National Historic Landmarks in Washington, D.C.
 National Register of Historic Places listings in Washington, D.C.
 Bridges on the National Register of Historic Places in Washington, D.C.
 National Register of Historic Places listings in Northeast Quadrant, Washington, D.C.
 National Register of Historic Places listings in Southeast Quadrant, Washington, D.C.
 National Register of Historic Places listings in Southwest Quadrant, Washington, D.C.
 National Register of Historic Places listings in Northwest Quadrant, Washington, D.C.
 National Monuments in Washington, D.C.
 President Lincoln's Cottage at the Soldiers' Home
 National Natural Landmarks in Washington, D.C.: none
 Bridges in Washington, D.C.
11th Street Bridges
 14th Street Bridges
Arlington Memorial Bridge
Boulder Bridge
Boundary Channel Bridge
Chain Bridge
Connecticut Avenue Bridge (Klingle Valley Bridge)
Dunbarton Bridge
Francis Scott Key Bridge
Frederick Douglass Memorial Bridge
Kutz Memorial Bridge
New York Avenue Bridge
Theodore Roosevelt Bridge
Pennsylvania Avenue Bridge
Ross Drive Bridge
William Howard Taft Bridge
Woodrow Wilson Memorial Bridge
 Neighborhoods in Washington, D.C.
 National Parks in Washington, D.C. (official units of the U.S. National Park System)
 Benjamin Banneker Park
 Carter G. Woodson Home National Historic Site
 Battleground National Cemetery
 Clara Barton Parkway
 Constitution Gardens
 East Potomac Park
 Ford's Theatre National Historic Site
 Fort Circle Parks
 Franklin D. Roosevelt Memorial
 Frederick Douglass National Historic Site
 Freedom Plaza
 Korean War Veterans Memorial
 Lincoln Memorial
 Lyndon Baines Johnson Memorial Grove on the Potomac
 Mary McLeod Bethune Council House National Historic Site
 National Capital Parks
Chesapeake and Ohio Canal National Historical Park
 George Washington Memorial Parkway
National Capital Parks-East
National Mall and Memorial Parks 
 National Mall
President's Park
Lafayette Square
The Ellipse
White House
 Rock Creek Park
 Pennsylvania Avenue National Historic Site
 Theodore Roosevelt Island
 Thomas Jefferson Memorial
 Vietnam Veterans Memorial
 Washington Monument
 West Potomac Park
 World War II Memorial
United States Capitol Complex
Union Square
Capitol Reflecting Pool
Ulysses S. Grant Memorial
United States Botanic Garden
United States Capitol
Apotheosis of Democracy
Hall of Columns
National Statuary Hall
National Statuary Hall Collection
Old Senate Chamber
Old Supreme Court Chamber
Statue of Freedom
United States Capitol crypt
United States Capitol dome
United States Capitol rotunda
United States Senate chamber
Washington's Tomb (United States Capitol)
United States Capitol Visitor Center
United States National Arboretum
Washington Aqueduct

Environment of Washington, D.C.

 Climate of Washington, D.C.
 Hurricanes in Washington, D.C.
 Tornados in Washington, D.C.
 Superfund sites in Washington, D.C.

Subdivisions of Washington, D.C.

 District of Columbia's At-large congressional district
 District of Columbia census statistical areas

Quadrants of Washington, D.C.

 Northwest, Washington, D.C.
 Northeast, Washington, D.C.
 Southeast, Washington, D.C.
 Southwest, Washington, D.C.

Neighborhoods of Washington, D.C.

The District of Columbia is divided into eight wards and 37 Advisory Neighborhood Commissions (ANCs) within these wards.

Ward 1

Adams Morgan 
• Columbia Heights 
• Kalorama 
• LeDroit Park 
• Mount Pleasant 
• Park View 
• Pleasant Plains 
• Shaw

Ward 2
Burleith 
• Downtown 
• Dupont Circle 
• Foggy Bottom 
• Georgetown 
• Sheridan Kalorama 
• Logan Circle 
• Mount Vernon Square 
• Shaw 
• West End

Ward 3
American University Park 
• Berkley 
• Cathedral Heights 
• Chevy Chase 
• Cleveland Park 
• Colony Hill 
• Forest Hills 
• Foxhall 
• Friendship Heights 
• Glover Park 
• Kent 
• Massachusetts Heights 
• McLean Gardens 
• North Cleveland Park 
• Observatory Circle 
• The Palisades 
• Potomac Heights 
• Spring Valley 
• Tenleytown 
• Wakefield 
• Wesley Heights 
• Woodland-Normanstone Terrace 
• Woodley Park  (Part of the neighborhood is also in Ward 1)

Ward 4

Barnaby Woods 
• Brightwood 
• Brightwood Park 
• Chevy Chase  (Part of the neighborhood is also in Ward 3)
• Colonial Village 
• Crestwood 
• Fort Totten 
• Hawthorne 
• Manor Park 
• Petworth 
• Riggs Park 
• Lamond-Riggs 
• Shepherd Park 
• Sixteenth Street Heights 
• Takoma

Ward 5
Arboretum 
• Bloomingdale 
• Brentwood 
• Brookland 
• Carver Langston 
• Eckington 
• Edgewood 
• Fort Lincoln 
• Fort Totten  (Part of the neighborhood is also in Ward 4)
• Gateway 
• Ivy City 
• Riggs Park  (Part of the neighborhood is also in Ward 4)
• Langdon 
• Michigan Park 
• North Michigan Park 
• Pleasant Hill 
• Stronghold/Metropolis View 
• Trinidad 
• Truxton Circle 
• Woodridge

Ward 6
Barney Circle 
• Capitol Hill 
• Chinatown 
• Judiciary Square 
• Kingman Park 
• Navy Yard/Near Southeast 
• Near Northeast 
• Penn Quarter 
• NoMa, Washington, D.C. 
• Southwest Federal Center 
• Southwest Waterfront 
• Sursum Corda 
• Swampoodle 
• Union Station

Ward 7
Benning Heights 
• Benning Ridge 
• Benning 
• Burrville 
• Capitol View 
• Civic Betterment 
• Deanwood 
• Dupont Park 
• Eastland Gardens 
• Fairfax Village 
• Fairlawn 
• Fort Davis 
• Fort Dupont 
• Good Hope 
• Grant Park 
• Greenway 
• Hillbrook 
• Hillcrest 
• Kenilworth 
• Kingman Park 
• Lincoln Heights 
• Mahaning Heights 
• Marshall Heights 
• Mayfair 
• Naylor Gardens 
• Penn Branch 
• Randle Highlands 
• River Terrace 
• Skyland 
• Summit Park 
• Twining

Ward 8
Anacostia 
• Barry Farm 
• Bellevue 
• Buena Vista 
• Congress Heights 
• Douglass 
• Fairlawn 
• Garfield Heights 
• Knox Hill 
• Shipley Terrace 
• Washington Highlands 
• Woodland

Demography of Washington, D.C.

 Political party strength in Washington, D.C.

Government and politics of Washington, D.C.

 Elections in the District of Columbia
 List of District of Columbia symbols

Structure of the government of Washington, D.C.
 District of Columbia home rule
 There are two committees in the United States Congress that oversee the District of Columbia:
 The United States House Committee on Oversight and Government Reform,which is the successor committee to the United States House Committee on the District of Columbia, and
 The United States Senate Committee on Homeland Security and Governmental Affairs
 United States congressional delegations from the District of Columbia (one non-voting delegate)

Branches of the government of Washington, D.C.

Executive branch of the government of Washington, D.C.
 Mayor of Washington, D.C.
 Advisory Neighborhood Commissions

Legislative branch of the government of

 Council of the District of Columbia

Judicial branch of the government of Washington, D.C.

 District of Columbia Court of Appeals (equivalent to a state supreme court)
 Superior Court of the District of Columbia

Law and order in Washington, D.C.

 Cannabis in Washington, D.C.
 Crime in Washington, D.C.
 Gun laws in Washington, D.C.
 Law enforcement in Washington, D.C.
 Metropolitan Police Department of the District of Columbia
 Recognition of same-sex unions in the District of Columbia
 Voting rights in the District of Columbia

Military in Washington, D.C.

 District of Columbia National Guard
 Military District of Washington
 Joint Force Headquarters National Capital Region

History of Washington, D.C. 

 L'Enfant Plan
 District of Columbia retrocession
 Residence Act

History of the District of Columbia, by period 

Indigenous peoples
American Revolutionary War, April 19, 1775 – September 3, 1783
United States Declaration of Independence, July 4, 1776
Treaty of Paris, September 3, 1783
State of Maryland, (1776–1791)
Commonwealth of Virginia, (1776–1791)
District of Columbia since March 3, 1791
President George Washington signs An Act for establishing the temporary and permanent seat of the Government of the United States on July 16, 1790
President George Washington proclaims location of the district for the permanent seat of the Government of the United States on January 24, 1791
President George Washington signs An Act to amend "An Act for establishing the temporary and permanent seat of the Government of the United States" on March 3, 1791
President John Adams moves into new White House on November 1, 1800
Sixth United States Congress meets in new United States Capitol on November 17, 1800
War of 1812, June 18, 1812 – March 23, 1815
Burning of Washington, August 24–25, 1814
Treaty of Ghent, December 24, 1814
Mexican–American War, April 25, 1846 – February 2, 1848
Retrocession of the District of Columbia, 1847
Know-Nothing Riot, 1857
American Civil War, April 12, 1861 – May 13, 1865
District of Columbia in the American Civil War
Assassination of President Abraham Lincoln on April 14, 1865
President Lincoln dies on April 15, 1865
Streetcars in the District of Columbia, 1862–1962
Assassination of President James A. Garfield on July 2, 1881
President Garfield dies on September 19, 1881
Protest marches on Washington, D.C. since 1894
McMillan Plan, 1901
United States Capitol shooting incident on March 1, 1954
Civil Rights Movement from December 1, 1955, to January 20, 1969
March on Washington for Jobs and Freedom on August 28, 1963
Martin Luther King Jr. delivers his I Have a Dream speech
President Lyndon Johnson signs the National Voting Rights Act on August 6, 1965
Twenty-third Amendment to the United States Constitution, 1960–1961
District of Columbia riots of 1968
District of Columbia Home Rule Act of 1973
United States Senate bombing of 1983
United States Capitol shooting incident of 1998
Attacks on the United States, including the Pentagon, on September 11, 2001

Culture of Washington, D.C.

 Architecture of Washington, D.C.
 Tallest buildings in Washington, D.C.
 Museums in Washington, D.C.
 People from Washington, D.C.
 Scouting in Washington, D.C.
 Symbols of the District of Columbia
 Flag of the District of Columbia 
 Great Seal of the District of Columbia

The Arts in Washington, D.C.
 Music of Washington, D.C.
 Outdoor sculpture in Washington, D.C.
 Theater in Washington, D.C.

Sports in Washington, D.C.

Economy and infrastructure of Washington, D.C. 

 Communications in Washington, D.C.
 District of Columbia Public Library
 Media in Washington, D.C.
 Newspapers in Washington, D.C.
 Radio stations in Washington, D.C.
 Television stations in Washington, D.C.
 Telephone service in Washington, D.C.
 Area code 202
 Healthcare in Washington, D.C.
 Hospitals in Washington, D.C.
 Transportation in Washington, D.C.
 Metrobus
 Metrobus routes in Washington, D.C.
 Airports in Washington, D.C.: none
 Rail transport in Washington, D.C.
 Railroads in Washington, D.C.
 Washington Metro
 Baltimore-Washington D.C. Maglev (proposed project)
 Roads in Washington, D.C.
 Circles in Washington, D.C.
 Washington, D.C. numbered highways
 Water in Washington, D.C.
 Washington Aqueduct
 District of Columbia Water and Sewer Authority
 Lead contamination in Washington, D.C. drinking water

Education in Washington, D.C. 

 Schools in Washington, D.C.
 District of Columbia Public Schools
 High schools in Washington, D.C.
 Colleges and universities in Washington, D.C.

See also

Topic overview:
Washington, D.C.

Index of Washington, D.C.-related articles

References

External links

Washington, DC
Washington, DC
District of Columbia